The Soko J-20 Kraguj (Sparrowhawk) is a light military, single-engine, low-wing single-seat aircraft with a metal airframe, capable of performing close air support, counterinsurgency (COIN), and reconnaissance missions, that was designed by VTI and manufactured by SOKO of Yugoslavia, first flown in 1962.

Design
It is of classic semi-monocoque, metal structure with a slightly tapered wing. The pilot is accommodated in an enclosed, heated and ventilated cockpit with adjustable seats. The cockpit canopy slides backwards to open. The landing gear is non-retractable with a tail wheel. Rubber dampers provide shock absorption, and hydraulic brakes are used for wheel braking.

The power plant comprises one 340 hp Textron Lycoming GSO-480-B1J6 piston engine and Hartzell HC-B3Z20-1/10151C-5 three-blade metal variable-pitch propeller. The engine cooling airflow is intensified by means of two specially designed ejectors. 36 US Gal of fuel contained in two rubber tanks enables a flight range of 350 NM for the fully armed configuration of the aircraft. 28 V DC electric power is supplied from a 1,5 kW generator and a storage battery. De-fogging and de-icing of the windshield is done by blowing of hot air.

Armament
Permanent armament comprises two wing-mounted 7.7 mm Colt–Browning Mk II machine guns with 650 rounds each and a collimator sight in the cockpit. For combat missions there is a capacity for an external load of bombs and two 57 mm and two 128 mm (HVAR-5) air-to-ground rocket launchers. Adapters on the underwing pylons can be used to switch the armament configuration from free-fall bombs to multi-tube launchers with twelve 57 mm air-to-ground rockets. Cluster or cargo bombs, or 128 mm air-to-ground rockets can be fitted.

Operation
The aircraft was specially designed for low-altitude missions against day and night visible ground targets in a broad area. It was readily available to be loaded with weapons and supplied through a flexible system of auxiliary airfields that required no special preparations, especially in mountainous regions. Yugoslav military planners assumed that potential aggressor will first disable airfields. Therefore, J-20 Kraguj was designed to take-off from short unprepared runways, even ones covered in deep snow when fitted with skis. It was also called a "Partisan aircraft".

The Kraguj P-2 was intended for close ground force support, and could be used for training of pilots in visual day/night flights, aiming, missile firing and bombing of ground targets.

Former operators

Croatian Air Force 

Republika Srpska Air Force 

SFR Yugoslav Air Force

Specifications (J-20)

See also

References

 Taylor, John W. R. (editor). Jane's All The World's Aircraft 1969–70. London: Sampson Low, 1969.

External links

 airserbia.com
 1000aircraftphotos.com

1960s Yugoslav attack aircraft
1960s Yugoslav military trainer aircraft
J-020 Kraguj
Single-engined tractor aircraft
Low-wing aircraft
Aircraft first flown in 1962
Military Technical Institute Belgrade